Air Force Cross may refer to:
Air Force Cross (South Africa)
Air Force Cross (United Kingdom)
Air Force Cross (United States)